Jurassic Park III: Park Builder is a construction and management simulation game for the Game Boy Advance that was developed by Konami. The game was released on September 10, 2001.

It is the second game, under the title Jurassic Park III, for the Game Boy Advance title games after The DNA Factor, released in the same year, it is followed by Island Attack.

Summary
Jurassic Park III: Park Builder challenges the player to design and run an island-based Jurassic Park theme park, similar to Jurassic Park: Operation Genesis. The player must first send an excavation team to one of eight worldwide locations to search for fossilized mosquitoes that contain dinosaur DNA, which is then used to create dinosaurs.

The player can place structures in the park such as hotels, restaurants and shops. Hurricanes and earthquakes can damage the park's buildings. The player must advertise the park in order to attract more customers. Visitors to the park must view the dinosaurs while riding on tour buses. The player begins with three buses and can purchase more later.

The player is given a maximum of eight holding pens for however many dinosaurs the park may have. There are six different environments on the island, including jungles, a beach, plains, and a desert. Dinosaurs can become ill and require medical attention. To keep them healthy, the dinosaurs are placed in environments that closely resemble their natural habitat.

The game features 140 creatures, including Brachiosaurus, Mosasaurus, Pteranodon, Spinosaurus, Stegosaurus and Tyrannosaurus. The dinosaurs, depending on their size and aggression, are grouped into six categories: three for carnivores and three for herbivores.

Reception

The game was met with average to mixed reception, as GameRankings gave it a score of 68.54%, while Metacritic gave it 65 out of 100.

AllGame criticized the game for its few sound effects and "generic background music", as well as the need to "constantly switch back and forth" between different menu screens, "making it easy to forget what you're doing in relation to what needs to be done."

IGN wrote a positive review but criticized the game for its lack of a tutorial mode: "It's a very complex game with tons of little elements to manage...and it's boggling to see that the developers don't offer even the most basic tutorial for beginner park builders. Right from the get-go, you're thrust into the game without knowing what does what, or how you're supposed to do it."

See also
List of Jurassic Park video games

References

External links

2001 video games
Game Boy Advance games
Game Boy Advance-only games
Park Builder
Konami games
Construction and management simulation games
Video games with oblique graphics
Video games based on films
Video games based on adaptations
Video games set on fictional islands
Video games developed in Japan